Ivica Žuljević (born 24 May 1980) is a Croatian retired football forward.

Career
He joined Belgian top-tier side Excelsior Mouscron from Međimurje in June 2005, only to leave them two months later citing personal reasons.

References

External links
 

1980 births
Living people
Association football forwards
Croatian footballers
NK Mosor players
NK Uskok players
NK Međimurje players
R.E. Mouscron players
FC Metalurh Donetsk players
Hapoel Petah Tikva F.C. players
HNK Trogir players
NK Dugopolje players
Ukrainian Premier League players
Israeli Premier League players
Croatian Football League players
First Football League (Croatia) players
Croatian expatriate footballers
Expatriate footballers in Belgium
Croatian expatriate sportspeople in Belgium
Expatriate footballers in Ukraine
Croatian expatriate sportspeople in Ukraine
Expatriate footballers in Israel
Croatian expatriate sportspeople in Israel